Anupgarh railway station is a main railway station in Anupgarh. and is assigned code as APH.  It serves Anupgarh city. There are Two platforms functioning. One of the platform of the platform is sheltered. Water facilities for passengers are provided.

References

Railway stations in Sri Ganganagar district
Bikaner railway division
Sri Ganganagar
Transport in Sri Ganganagar